Argenna is a genus of cribellate araneomorph spiders in the family Dictynidae, and was first described by Tamerlan Thorell in 1870.

Species
 it contains seven species:
Argenna alxa Tang, 2011 – China
Argenna obesa Emerton, 1911 – USA, Canada
Argenna patula (Simon, 1874) – Europe, Caucasus, Russia (Europe to South Siberia), Kyrgyzstan, China, Iran?
Argenna polita (Banks, 1898) – Mexico
Argenna sibirica Esyunin & Stepina, 2014 – Russia (West Siberia)
Argenna subnigra (O. Pickard-Cambridge, 1861) (type) – Europe, Azerbaijan, China
Argenna yakima Chamberlin & Gertsch, 1958 – USA

References

Araneomorphae genera
Cosmopolitan spiders
Dictynidae
Taxa named by Tamerlan Thorell